Valiollah Shojapourian is an Iranian reformist politician who serves as Socio-Cultural Deputy to Mayor of Tehran. He was a member of the City Council of Tehran, and also a former member of the Parliament of Iran.

References
 Biography

1962 births
Living people
Union of Islamic Iran People Party politicians
National Trust Party (Iran) politicians
Members of the 6th Islamic Consultative Assembly
Members of the 7th Islamic Consultative Assembly
Islamic Association of University Instructors politicians
Islamic Iran Participation Front politicians
Tehran Councillors 2013–2017
Faculty of Letters and Humanities of the University of Tehran alumni
Payame Noor University alumni